Fairground is a neighborhood of St. Louis, Missouri. The neighborhood's boundaries are defined as Glasgow Avenue on the east, west and North Florissant Avenues on the north, Warne on the west, and Fairground Park and Natural Bridge Avenue on the south.

Demographics

In 2020 Fairground's racial makeup was 93.7% Black, 2.8% White, 0.4% Native American, 2.2% Two or More Races, and 1.0% Some Other Race. 0.9% of the population was of Hispanic or Latino origin.

Police
St. Louis Police Department  District 6 
North Patrol Division 
4014 Union 
St. Louis, MO 63115

See also
 Grand Boulevard (St. Louis)

References

External links
Neighborhood Data Profile for Fairground Neighborhood

Neighborhoods in St. Louis